Forrest Gainer (born April 15, 1979) is a Canadian rugby player. He plays for Canada national rugby union team. Gainer is 180.3 cm tall (5 ft 11) and weighs 111.8 kg (247 lb).

External links
Rugby Canada: Player Profiles

1979 births
Living people
Canada international rugby union players
Canadian rugby union players
Sportspeople from Edmonton
Rugby union props